Lecithocera percnobela is a moth in the family Lecithoceridae. It was described by Edward Meyrick in 1911. It is found in southern India.

The wingspan is 17–19 mm. The forewings are dark ashy fuscous, the veins obscurely marked with blackish. The stigmata are obscure and blackish, the plical dash like, rather before the first discal, which is also rather elongate. The hindwings are grey.

References

Moths described in 1911
percnobela